The Donner Party was an ill-fated group of pioneers in 1846–1847.   

Donner Party or The Donner Party may also refer to:
 The Donner Party (1992 film), a documentary by Ric Burns
 The Donner Party (2009 film), a film by T.J. Martin
 The Donner Party (band), a San Francisco-based indie rock band
 The Donner Party, an album by American Murder Song
 "Donner Party (All Night)", a song by Alkaline Trio from Good Mourning
 "The Donner Party", a song by Rasputina from Thanks for the Ether

See also
 Donner (disambiguation)
 "Throwing a Donner Party", a song by Giant Squid from Monster in the Creek
 "Throwing a Donner Party at Sea", a song by Giant Squid from The Ichthyologist